The Division 2 season 1993/1994, organised by the LFP was won by OGC Nice and saw the promotions of OGC Nice, Stade Rennais FC and SC Bastia, whereas FC Rouen, US Valenciennes, FC Bourges and FC Istres were relegated to Division 3.

22 participating teams

 Alès
 Bastia
 Beauvais
 Bourges
 Charleville
 Dunkerque
 Gueugnon
 Istres
 Laval
 Le Mans
 Mulhouse
 Nancy
 Nice
 Nîmes
 Niort
 Red Star
 Rennes
 Rouen
 Saint-Brieuc
 Sedan
 Valence
 Valenciennes

League table

Recap
 Promoted to D1 : OGC Nice, Stade Rennais FC, SC Bastia 
 Relegated to D2 : Olympique de Marseille, Toulouse FC, Angers SCO
 Promoted to D2 : FC Perpignan, LB Châteauroux, En Avant Guingamp, Amiens SC
 Relegated to D3 : FC Rouen, US Valenciennes, FC Bourges, FC Istres

Results

Top goalscorers

External links
RSSSF archives of results

Ligue 2 seasons
French
2